Guillaume Visser (20 April 1880 – 1952) was a Belgian rower. He competed at the 1912 Summer Olympics in Stockholm with the men's coxed four where they were eliminated in the quarter-finals. Over a ten-year period, he won 19 medals at European Championships, including 13 gold medals.

References

1880 births
1952 deaths
Belgian male rowers
Olympic rowers of Belgium
Rowers at the 1912 Summer Olympics
Rowers at the 1920 Summer Olympics
Sportspeople from Antwerp
European Rowing Championships medalists
20th-century Belgian people